Mark Peter Guest (born 4 December 1983) is an English cricketer.  Guest is a right-handed batsman who played primarily as a wicketkeeper.  He was born at Gloucester, Gloucestershire.

Guest represented the Gloucestershire Cricket Board in a single List A match against the Surrey Cricket Board in the 1st round of the 2003 Cheltenham & Gloucester Trophy which was played in 2002 at the County Ground, Bristol.  In his only List A match, he scored an unbeaten 29 runs and behind the stumps he took a single catch and made a single stumping.

He currently plays club cricket for Sutton Coldfield Cricket Club.

References

External links
Mark Guest at Cricinfo
Mark Guest at CricketArchive

1983 births
Living people
Cricketers from Gloucester
English cricketers
Gloucestershire Cricket Board cricketers
Wicket-keepers